Tyler Justus Paige (born 4 September 1995) is an American competitive sailor. He competed in the 2020 Summer Olympics in the Men's Two Person Dinghy - 470 for American Samoa, placing 18th.

Paige is from New York City and attended high school at the Packer Collegiate Institute in Brooklyn. He was educated at Tufts University in Medford, Massachusetts, graduating with a degree in mechanical engineering. He worked as an engineer with Dale Earnhardt Jr.'s NASCAR Xfinity team JR Motorsports while he was in the Olympics. He is currently an Engineer at Honeywell. 

Paige sailed as a child, initially in the 420-class, before moving to 470-class sailing in 2016. He represented the United States at the 2018 Junior 470 World Championships in Bracciano, Italy. He switched nationalities to American Samoa in 2019. In 2020 he and Adrian Hoesch qualified for the Tokyo 2020 Olympics for American Samoa at Sail Melbourne.

References

External links
 

1995 births
Living people
American Samoan male sailors (sport)
Olympic sailors of American Samoa
Sailors at the 2020 Summer Olympics – 470
Tufts University School of Engineering alumni